John Kendrick may refer to:

 John Kendrick (cloth merchant) (1573–1624), English cloth merchant
 John Kendrick (lord mayor) (died 1661), Lord Mayor of London in 1652
 John Kendrick (American sea captain) (1740–1794), American sea captain
 John Kendrick Jr., his son, maritime fur trader, merchant and Spanish Navy officer
 John Kendrick (Connecticut politician) (1825–1877), Connecticut state legislator and mayor
 John Allen Kendrick (1897–1960), American criminal and bank robber
 John B. Kendrick (1857–1933), United States Senator from Wyoming
 John Whitefield Kendrick (1917–2009), American economist
 John William Kendrick (1853–1924), American railway executive
 John Kendrick (cashier), first Chief Cashier of the Bank of England